The Association of Professional Recording Services (APRS) is a trade association for the audio industry in the United Kingdom.

Overview
The APRS has a strong presence within the industry and lobby on behalf of their members for the best environment possible to be working in. Their members are involved in all aspects of the audio field, including recording studios, post-production houses. They are providers of education and training, as well as record producers, audio engineers and manufacturers. The APRS also have relationships with other organisations and industry bodies to cater to their members interests.

External links

Catalogue of the APRS archives, held at the Modern Records Centre, University of Warwick

Professional Recording Services
Trade associations based in the United Kingdom